Derrinagree, also spelled Dernagree and Derinagree, is a small village in north west of County Cork, Ireland. It is in civil parish of Dromtarrife in the barony of Duhallow.

Location and amenities
Derrinagree is located just off the N72 road which links Mallow to Killarney. The nearest market towns are Millstreet (8.5km) to the south and Boherbue (6km) to the north. The village has no public transport. The closest rail links are from Millstreet and Banteer stations. Derrinagree has a primary school and a Catholic church. Derrinagree used to have a post office, but it closed in 2015.

Sport
Dromtarriffe GAA club represents Derrinagree in Gaelic football and hurling.

See also
 List of townlands of the barony of Duhallow

References

Towns and villages in County Cork